Daechu-gom is a Korean porridge (juk) that features jujubes.

Preparation 
Washed and dried jujubes are boiled in water, strained, and sieved to remove the seeds. Sieved jujube is then boiled, with glutinous rice flour slurry added a little at a time while simmering. The dish is seasoned with salt and garnished with chopped walnuts and whole pine nuts.

References 

Fruit dishes
Korean cuisine